Malda College is a college in English Bazar in the Malda district of West Bengal, India. The college is affiliated to the University of Gour Banga, which offers undergraduate and postgraduate courses in several subjects. Established on July 23, 1944, it is the oldest state-governed college in Malda district.

History
The roots of the college can be traced to a pre-partition temporary college at Dadanchak (presently under Shibganj Police Station in the district of Nawabganj, Bangladesh). In mid-1943, a report was published in one of the popular local newspapers appealing the public of Maldah district to donate in order to establish the estimated fund of 300,000 Rupees, required to change the Dadanchak College's location to Malda. The much-needed land was given by Mr. Jadunandan Choudhury and Mr. Asutosh Choudhury. In a very little time, the people of Malda donated the estimated sum, which helped start the initial work for shifting. On 1 May 1944, the University of Calcutta granted affiliation to Malda College and on 23 July 1944 the college was officially established by the then District Magistrate of English Bazar, Mr. W. H. Saumarez Smith, as an "Intermediate Arts and Commerce College", with eight teachers and 150 students. In the founding phase, the college was affiliated to teach English, Vernacular Bengali, Philosophy, Economics, History, and Sanskrit. In 1952, the college moved from its original rented building at the present-day Atul Market-area, Malda, to a new building at Rathbari More, Malda, in a large compound. Two auditoriums were built in 1994, commemorating the golden jubilee celebrations.

Location
Malda College is located at English Bazar, in the Malda district of West Bengal, India, right on the National Highway 12. The full address of the college (for the purpose of correspondence) is: The Principal, Malda College, Rabindra Avenue, Rathbari More, Post Office + District: Malda, Pin-732101, West Bengal, India.

Administration
The college is administrated by Administrator, currently, Mr. Rajarshi Mitra, IAS and Principal, currently Dr. Manas Kr Baidya. Bursur of the college is Sri Arup Roy Choudhury and IQAC coordinator is Mr. Prabhas Choudhuri.

Departments

Science
Botany
Chemistry
Computer Science (and B.C.A.)
Mathematics
Physics
Zoology

Arts and Commerce

Arabic
Bengali
Commerce
Economics
Education
English
Geography
History
Philosophy
Political Science
Sanskrit
Sociology

Malda College offers three post graduate courses on Bengali, English and History. Malda College is also the study-centre of Netaji Subhas Open University, Kolkata, while the Directorate of Distance Education, University of Burdwan, opened its branch at the college on 8 June 2013.

Journals
Malda College publish UGC approved two journals:

1. Indian Journal of Multidisciplinary Academic Research 

2. Exploring History

Accreditation

In 2021, the college has been awarded B+ grade by National Assessment and Accreditation Council (NAAC) in 2nd cycle. The college is recognized by the University Grants Commission (UGC).

Notable alumni
 Abu Nasar Khan Choudhury
 Tapan Sikdar

See also

References

External links
Official Website
University of Gour Banga
University Grants Commission
National Assessment and Accreditation Council

Academic institutions formerly affiliated with the University of North Bengal
Educational institutions established in 1944
Colleges affiliated to University of Gour Banga
Universities and colleges in Malda district
1944 establishments in India